Jean-François Beltramini (5 February 1948 – 27 August 2014) was a French professional footballer who played as a striker.

Career
Beltramini played for Division 2 sides CA Mantes, Reims, Laval and Paris FC with whom he first played in the Division 1 at 30 years. He then played at Paris Saint-Germain before also helping Rouen win promotion to France's top tier in 1982. He would go on to score 54 league goals for the club.

References

External links
Profile
Profile
Career stats

1948 births
2014 deaths
Footballers from Yvelines
French footballers
Stade de Reims players
Stade Lavallois players
Paris FC players
Paris Saint-Germain F.C. players
FC Rouen players
Ligue 1 players
Ligue 2 players
French sportspeople of Italian descent
Deaths from cancer in France
Association football forwards